Harald Ofner (born 25 October 1932, Vienna, Austria) is an Austrian lawyer and politician for the Freedom Party of Austria (FPÖ).

From 1942 to 1945 Ofner attended the Nazi-era National Political Institutes of Education in Traiskirchen near Vienna. Subsequently, he became a heavy current electrician. He attended a Matura school and studied law (Dr. iur., 1958). By 1965, he was a lawyer.

His political career began in the town council of Mödling. From 1976 to 1986, he was a provincial team leader of the FPÖ Lower Austria branch. From 1979 to 1983, and from 1986 to 2002 he was a deputy to the National Council. From 1983 to 1987, Ofner was Austrian justice minister in the governments of Fred Sinowatz and Franz Vranitzky.

Ofner previously defended Peter Paul Rainer in 2000. Rainer, which by 1997 was the former party chairman and co-founder of the South Tyrol-based FPÖ offshoot Die Freiheitlichen, had shot Christian Waldner, one of the other co-founding members of Die Freiheitlichen. Despite efforts by Ofner, Rainer was, shortly after his arrest in the Rudolfsheim-Fünfhaus district of Vienna,  extradited to Italy.

Trivia 
During the Lucona affair, the then Minister of Justice Ofner actuated in a parliamentary debate the saying: Meaning "The soup is too thin" in English, he meant that the evidence for an accusation was not sufficient. Since then, this saying has been used in judicial and journalist circles for similar cases.

References

External links 
 
 
 Audio recordings with Harald Ofner in the online archive of the Österreichischen Mediathek (speeches, radio reports)

Members of the National Council (Austria)
University of Vienna alumni
Freedom Party of Austria politicians
1932 births
Lawyers from Vienna
Order of the Dannebrog
Living people
Justice ministers of Austria